"La Rebelión" (translation "the rebellion") is a salsa song written and performed by the Colombian singer Joe Arroyo. The song tells the story of a married African couple, slaves of a Spaniard, in Cartagena, Colombia in the 17th century. The slave owner abuses the wife, and the husband avenges her, starting a rebellion. The recording featured a piano solo by Chelito De Castro. The song was an international hit. 

The song has been included in several lists of the greatest Colombian songs of all time:
 Viva Music Colombia rated the song No. 1 on its list of the 100 most important Colombian songs of all time.

 It was selected by Hip Latina in 2017 as one of the "13 Old School Songs Every Colombian Grew Up Listening To"; it was praised for its powerful lyrics and described as "one of those 'hold my drink, I'm going to go dance,' songs." 
 
 In its list of the 50 best Colombian songs of all time, El Tiempo, Colombia's most widely circulated newspaper, ranked the song at No. 43.

The song became an anthem of pride for Black people in Latin America. 

It was listed on Billboards  "15 Best Salsa Songs Ever" in 2018.

It was covered by J Balvin in 2019 for a television commercial for Cerveza Aguila.

References

Colombian songs
Works about slavery
Joe Arroyo songs